Ömerli District is a district of the Mardin Province of Turkey. The seat of the district is the town of Ömerli and the population was 13,978 in 2021. It is the least populated district in the province.

Status 
With the administrative reform in 2012, Ömerli District contains forty-six neighborhoods of which three form the town of Ömerli. Dönerdede neighborhood is uninhabited.

Settlements

Center neighborhoods 

 Cumhuriyet
 Şafak
 Yenimahalle

Rural neighborhoods 

Akyokuş
Alıçlı
Anıttepe
Beşikkaya
Çalışan
Çatalyurt
Çayıralanı
Çınaraltı
Çimenlik
Dönerdere
Duygulu
Fıstıklı
Göllü
Güzelağaç
Harmankaya
Havuzbaşı
Işıkdere
İkipınar
İkitepe
Kayabalı
Kayadere
Kayagöze
Kayaüstü
Kaynakkaya
Kocakuyu
Kocasırt
Kovanlı
Kömürlü
Mutluca
Ovabaşı
Öztaş
Pınarcık
Salihköy
Sivritepe
Sulakdere
Taşgedik
Taşlıca
Tavuklu
Tekkuyu
Tokdere
Topağaç
Ünsallı
Yaylatepe

References 

Districts of Mardin Province